Love & Hero is Taiwanese Mandopop artist Alien Huang's Mandarin solo debut studio album. It was released on 24 December 2009 by Rock Records and on 5 February 2010 a commemorate edition was released containing a bonus DVD version.

The album debuted at number one on Taiwan's G-Music Weekly Combo and Mandarin Charts, and number two on Five Music Chart.

His song "Screwed it Up" was written by two members from Mayday, vocalist Ashin and guitarist Wen Shang-yi, known as Monster for the first time collaborate, as well as Wu Bai with "Love Hero".

Track listing
 "玩具槍與玫瑰" (Toy Guns & Roses)
 "搞砸了" (Screwed it Up)
 "我不要長生不老" (I Don't Want Immortality)
 "沒人愛俱樂部" (Loveless Club)
 "為自己" (For Myself)
 "懶得理你" (Not Bothered With You)
 "地球上最浪漫的一首歌" (World's Most Romantic Song)
 "總冠軍" (Final Champion)
 "不要就拉倒" (Do Not Leave It)
 "Love Hero"
 "不屑" (Disdain)

Bonus DVD
Live & Love: Alien Hunag «Final Champion» Collectible Edition黃鴻升『Love_Hero總冠軍』珍藏特輯
Length: 60 mins
 100 days of album recording
 Styling of Love_Hero
 MV's Making of
 "玩具槍與玫瑰" (Toy Guns and Roses) MV
 "搞砸了" (Screwed Up) MV
 "地球上最浪漫的一首歌" (World's Most Romantic Song) MV

Charts

References

External links
 Love_Hero album info on Rock Records site
 Love_Hero (CD+DVD) album info on Rock Records site

2009 debut albums
Alien Huang albums